Hakavan (also Romanized as Hakavān, Hakvān, and Hakwan) is a village in Farmeshkhan Rural District, in the Central District of Kavar County, Fars Province, Iran. At the 2006 census, its population was 678, in 138 families.

References 

Populated places in Kavar County